The National Gas Company of Trinidad and Tobago Limited (NGC) is a state-owned natural gas company. It was created by the Government of Trinidad and Tobago in 1975.  NGC is operating in the field of gas pipelines, industrial sites, gas production, port and marine infrastructure, natural gas liquids and liquefied natural gas. It has assets worth $43 billion. Its credit rating by Moody's is Baa2  and A− from S&P  The company currently operates in Point Lisas, Couva at the Point Lisas Industrial Estate.

See also

 Atlantic LNG

External links
 Company website

Oil and gas companies of Trinidad and Tobago
Trinidad
Non-renewable resource companies established in 1975